The Minnesota Senate, District 37, encompasses portions of Anoka County in the northern Twin Cities metropolitan area.  It has formerly included Brown, Lac Qui Parle, Lyon, Redwood, Yellow Medicine, Chippewa, Swift, Carver, Ramsey, Hennepin, Dakota, Washington, Goodhue, and Scott counties; and served Ramsey County for the longest.  The district is currently served by Democratic-Farmer-Labor Senator Jerry Newton.

District profile
The district stretches along the southern edge of Anoka County from the Ramsey County and Hennepin County borders, excluding the cities of Fridely, Hilltop, and Columbia Heights.

Due to redistricting, the 37th district has been moved around various counties in the southern part of the state.  The current iteration resulted from the 2010 redistricting by the Minnesota State Legislature, which became effective in 2012.

2010

Part of Anoka County
Blaine
Coon Rapids
Spring Lake Park

As of 2016, the population of the 37th district was split 49.1% male and 50.9% female, with 48.2% of men and 51.8% of women being eligible to vote.  93.9% of residents were at least a high school graduate (or equivalent), and 30.5% had earned a bachelor's degree or higher.  31.8% of the population is of German ancestry, the largest ethic group in the district, followed by Norwegian descent at 13.5%.  The unemployment rate was at 4.8%.

List of senators

Recent elections

2016
The candidate filing deadline was May 31, 2016.  Incumbent Alice Johnson did not seek re-election.  The primary election took place on August 9, 2016; both Jerry Newton and Brad Sanford ran unopposed.  The general election was held on November 8, 2016, resulting in Newton's victory.

2012
Elections for the Minnesota State Senate occurred after state-wide redistricting from 2010.  The signature-filing deadline for candidates wishing to run in this election was June 5, 2012.  Alice Johnson defeated incumbent Pam Wolf in the general election, neither of whom faced opposition in their primaries.

References 

Minnesota Senate districts
Anoka County, Minnesota